Lord Cathcart was launched at Shields in 1807. Between 1816 and 1919 she traded with the Cape of Good Hope. She experienced two notable events, her detention in Chile in 1822 and her wrecking in 1825.

Career
Lord Cathcart entered Lloyd's Register (LR) in 1808 with Richardson, master, Bulmer & Co., owners, and trade London transport.

The Register of Shipping reports the following information:

Detention: Lloyd's List on 2 October 1821 reported a letter dated Rio de Janeiro, 23 July. It stated that Lord Cochrane had landed 500 men at Arica and captured the town. The troops had also seized four vessels there: Lord Cathcart, Columbia, Joseph, and Robert. Lord Cathcart and Columbia had already landed their cargoes. A later report confirmed that Lord Cathcart, Watson, master, of and from London, was among the vessels seized at Arica.

Cochrane apparently released Lord Cathcart. In a letter dated 2 October, Valparaiso, Watson reported that she had again been detained, at Valparaiso, "in consequence of dispatches received from Lord Cochrane." On 18 May 22, at Valparaiso, Lord Cathcarts cargo was condemned as Spanish property. 

Lloyd's Register for 1824 showed Lord Cathcarts master changing from D. Dipnall to M'Dougal. Her owner was Staniforth, and her trade Plymouth–Odessa. 

Lloyd's List reported on 10 August 1824 that Lord Cathcart, M'Dougal, master, had arrived at Liverpool from Miramichi. On 1 August she had run afoul of a large ship off Cape Clear Island. Lord Cathcart had lost her foreyard and jib-boom, and had suffered other damage.

Fate
Mearns, Nichols, master, arrived at Greenock on 17 November 1825. She had left Miramichi, New Brunswick, on 27 October and she brought the news that three vessels had been lost on 18 October on West Point, Prince Edward Island. The three were:
Lord Cathcart, M'Dougal, sailing from Miramichi to the Clyde;
Hamlet, Christie, master; and,
Protector, Robson, master, sailing from Clyde to Miramichi.

All the crews were saved.

Citations

1807 ships
Ships built by Temple shipbuilders
Age of Sail merchant ships of England
Captured ships
Maritime incidents in October 1825